The Romanian Red Cross (CRR), also known as the National Society of Red Cross from Romania (Societatea Naționalǎ de Cruce Roșie din România), is a volunteer-led, humanitarian organization that provides emergency assistance, disaster relief and education inside Romania. It is the designated national affiliate of the International Federation of Red Cross and Red Crescent Societies.

History of the RNRC

Establishment and early history
Romania became a signatory to the First Geneva Convention of 1864 and ratified it in 1874. Two years later, on July 4, 1876, the Romanian Red Cross Society was founded in Romania and began work in the present headquarters of the Colțea Hospital in Bucharest.

Among the signatories of the founding document of the Romanian Red Cross, there were important personalities of the time, such as: Nicolae Cretzulescu, George Gr. Cantacuzino, C.A. Rosetti, Ion Ghica, Dimitrie Sturza, Gr. G. Cantacuzino and Dr. Carol Davila.

The first president of the Romanian Red Cross was Prince Dimitrie Ghica, between 1876 and 1897.

In less than three weeks after the establishment, on July 20, 1876, the first Romanian Red Cross ambulance went on a humanitarian mission on the Serbian-Turkish front, south of the Danube. On the basis of solidarity that unites National Societies, the first mission of the Romanian Red Cross was meant to provide medical help to wounded soldiers, regardless of belligerent state tp which they belonged.

Romanian War of Independence and First Balkan War
During the War of Independence of 1877–1878, the Romanian Red Cross has stepped in with medical personnel, ambulances and sanitary trains in supporting the campaign. A hospital was founded in Bucharest and medical settlements in different cities all over the country. Red Cross Societies from Germany, Italy, Belgium, Sweden and France sent material aid and medical personnel. On the front near Rahova, the Red Cross volunteers fought to limit the ravages of typhoid fever.

In 1885, the first Balkan war broke out, and the Romanian Red Cross proposed to the governments of two countries – Bulgaria and Serbia – to accept an ambulance to carry the wounded. Immediately after receiving the agreement, two Romanian Red Cross ambulances had left the country, providing medical assistance to a total of 625 wounded and sick. Romanian sanitary formations deployed in Serbia and took care of three hospitals with a total of 110 beds. Material effort of the Romanian Red Cross amounted to 40,000 lei at the time.

The proven skill and care of the Romanian doctors have been particularly appreciated by the governments of both belligerent countries.

Between 1888 and 1892, the Romanian Red Cross has expanded its activities by organizing special courses to prepare nurses. In 1891, a permanent school for nurses was established, and a year later a teaching hospital with 10 beds was founded. Taking advantage of a brief period of peace, the Romanian Red Cross has continued to organize and prepare, both in material terms, but also in terms of staff, to be able to act more effectively in case of necessity.

Second Balkan War, cholera epidemics in Romania

In 1913, during the second Balkan War, the Romanian Red Cross mobile hospital staff provided assistance to soldiers suffering from a cholera outbreak on Bulgarian territory.

With the return of troops in the country, cholera spread in Romania, affecting a large number of people in the counties of Romanati, Teleorman and Dolj. The Red Cross intervened after it was requested this time by the national authorities and so large tents, medical supplies and medical teams managed to nurture and save thousands of cholera infected patients. In a letter of gratitude to the President of the Romanian Red Cross Alexandru Marghiloman, dr. Laugier, chief physician of the county of Dolj, wrote: "With gratitude I find that the cholera epidemic was completely extinguished in the shortest possible time, giving conscientious and skilled care to patients". The Red Cross medical teams had only mobile units at the time, but also a bacteriology laboratory, where they were performed more than 7,000 medical tests, "reaching out to 44 communes with people infected with cholera".

By the statute of the Red Cross, adopted in 1876, women were not part of the leadership of the Society. Therefore, in 1906, the Ladies Red Cross Society in Romania was established. Its first elected president was Irina Campineanu. The society was operating in parallel with the one established in 1876 and it dealt with raising funds to help in time of war and disaster, preparing volunteers, co-opted devoted ladies in almost all cities around the country. In 1915, the General Assembly of the National Red Cross Society approved the merger of these two entities. On this occasion, Queen Marie, under whose patronage the Red Cross was at that time, the Romanian people was sent the following message: "The Red Cross, our hope in case of peace as in war, should not perish. Everyone of us, small to large should support it with devotion, enthusiasm and infinite love."

The Romanian Red Cross after the First World War
With the support of a large number of volunteers, the Romanian Red Cross passed the fire test of the First World War. The mission of the RNRC was to assist the military by organizing 58 Hospitals both Bucharest and whole Romania. At the call of the Red Cross National Society, women belonging to various social groups have volunteered to work in hospitals and canteens run by the organization. Queen Marie herself was involved in operations, in support of those wounded. 

During these difficult years for the country, the Romanian Red Cross assisted more than 150,000 wounded in own hospitals, provided food for soldiers, refugees and people affected by conflict, facilitated the exchange of correspondence between the POWs and their families, supported Romanian prisoners held in enemy camps with food and clothing. Funds for these operations have been mobilized by the Red Cross from public donations, from the population and from external sources.

After stopping the cholera, another epidemic broke out throughout the full scale armed conflict: typhus. In early 1917, the Romanian Red Cross cared for the wounded evacuated from the front, and patients affected by the two serious infectious diseases. The RNRC had to face this difficult situation, given that the occupying army requisitioned the best medical establishments of the Red Cross and took to benefit their own troops, for a good part of the materials and drugs that were bought with huge efforts by the RNRC. Only in the occupied capital over 7,000 patients were cared for. The RNRC branches were active in over 40 cities, taking care of thousands of wounded and sick.

Romanian Red Cross Presidents
 Prince Dimitrie Ghica (1876–1897)
 George Gr. Cantacuzino (1897–1913)
 Ion Kalinderu (June 1913 – December 1913)
 Alexandru Marghiloman (1914–1925)
 Alexandru Constantinescu (March 1926 – November 1926)
 Gheorghe Balș (1927–1934)
 Dr. Ion Costinescu (1934–1947)
 G-ral Nicolae Pârvulescu (1947–1949)
 Constanța Crăciun (1949–1953)
 Acad. Prof. Dr. Vasile Mârza (1953–1955)
 Dr. Octavian Belea (1955–1958)
 G-ral Radu Rusescu (1958–1960)
 Anton Moisescu (1960–1972)
 G-ral Mihai Burcă (1972–1977)
 G-ral Constantin Burada (1977–1981)
 Lidia Orădeanu (1981–1986)
 Veronica Ciobănete (1986–1989)
 Nicolae Nicoară (1990–2002)
 Dr. Nifon Mihaiță (2002–2007)
 Mihaela Geoană (2007–2015)
 Margareta of Romania (2015–Present)

Prevention and disaster relief
The RNRC is the only humanitarian organization in the country which has clear duties as auxiliary to public authorities, especially in the field of prevention and intervention in case of disaster.

First aid
Basic First Aid is only a temporary relief granted in an emergency case to save lives, prevent suffering further complications and improve until an appropriate medical service can intervene.The Romanian Red Cross has an unbroken tradition of over 134 years in giving basic first aid training and volunteer Red Cross nurses. The first courses on proper "bandaging" was organized in 1877, at the Colțea Hospital in Bucharest. Since then, thousands have graduated from first aid courses or Red Cross volunteer sisters courses. Romanian personalities wore throughout white uniforms with the emblem of the Red Cross. During World War I, Queen Marie, dressed in Red Cross nurse's uniform, inspected the front or rear front of hospitals campaign and actively took part in assisting those injured.

The RNRC organizes regular courses on basic first aid at each county branch. These courses are given by medics, which are attested as trainers of paramedical assistance. The RNRC always offers its trainees all the necessary equipment, materials and tools. This course is finalised with an exam which proves that the person who took part in these courses is qualified in giving basic first aid.

Health education
If a century ago the RNRC run campaigns against malaria and typhus, today the Romanian Red Cross is working to prevent and combat HIV/AIDS, TB and avian flu, each time getting involved in public health priority issues. Drug use, maternal health, combating non-communicable diseases, respiratory, and cardiovascular diseases are special problems that are also in the RNRC's attention.

The program addresses the entire population, in general, and in particular reaches out to youth, and the shares are held in partnership with governmental institutions and NGOs. Health Programs are developed with the support of volunteers trained in seminars organized by the Romanian Red Cross.

RNRC prepares and distributes information materials: leaflets, brochures, educational and health-themed campaigns and actions on specific themes. Also, the Romanian Red Cross marks annually, through public events, today's global health issues, and those of the World Health Organization schedule.

Social services
The Romanian Red Cross social program is aimed at improving the living conditions of vulnerable people. For the Romanian Red Cross, "vulnerable people" are those who are at risk, due to situations that threaten their survival or their ability to live in conditions of minimum material security and human dignity. These actions aimed at improving the quality of life of those in need are generally developed in three main directions:
 prevent suffering by helping people in preparing to avoid exposure to situations that may increase vulnerability
 helping people whose vulnerability is worsened by a disaster or crisis
 relief of suffering by reducing vulnerability, improving capacities of people who live constantly in situations where their material security and human dignity are threatened

The group, which is the target and address of the RNRC social program, consists of: persons residing in Romania and, for economic, physical, mental or social reasons are unable to ensure social needs. If the basic social needs have not been met, such as food, shelter, clothing, health – where the most vulnerable people are; the main focus most certainly are those living in extreme poverty – under a dollar a day.

Missing persons
People search service is a special and unique service of the Red Cross, at an international level, in the humanitarian field.

Being nearly a century old, the Red Cross people search service has a range of action in 186 countries worldwide. This service can restore and maintain ties between family members, due to international armed conflicts, internal national disturbances, natural disasters or special social situations, of a humanitarian nature, that were separated.

Romanian Red Cross responds to all requests of citizens who meet the following search criteria:

- interruption of contact with relatives abroad
- locate missing relatives during international conflicts
- mediation to obtain certificates of detention, imprisonment, deportation, death
- transmission of Red Cross messages (to/from) conflict areas, where normal communication channels have been discontinued
- assistance to unaccompanied minors, following an armed conflict, to restore family links

Branches
In Romania, the RNRC has 47 branches, 1,996 sub-branches and 1,207 committees is making benefit of a single and unique structure, established over 130 years ago.
There exists a county branch in each of the counties of Romania, plus one for each sector of the city of Bucharest. The sub-branches are organised as one for each, city, town, commune and village.

References

Red Cross and Red Crescent national societies
1876 establishments in Romania
Organizations established in 1876
Medical and health organizations based in Romania